Al-Aghwal Al-Sufla is a sub-district located in Radman Al Awad District, Al Bayda Governorate, Yemen.  Al-Aghwal Al-Sufla had a population of 1961 according to the 2004 census.

References 

Sub-districts in Radman Al Awad District